Melvin B. Clifford was a politician who served as Mayor of Brockton, Massachusetts from 1950 to 1951.

Early life
Clifford grew up in Brockton. During his youth, he took part in auto races at the Brockton Fair.

Business career
Clifford owned his own auto repair shop. He then worked as a Drivers Ed teacher at Brockton High School. Before becoming Mayor, Clifford worked as a roofing contractor.

Politics

City Council
In 1947, Clifford was elected to the Brockton City Council in his first bid for elected office. During his tenure he fought Mayor Joseph H. Downey on many issues.

Mayor
In 1949, Clifford made a last-minute decision to challenge Downey. On November 8, 1949, Clifford defeated Thomas P. Downey 14,444 votes to 14,154. Downey was a late substitute for his brother, who died five days before the election.

Clifford was sworn in on January 2, 1950. In his inaugural address, Clifford promised economy in government, efforts to stop gambling, and an end to the misuse of city vehicles.

Clifford was defeated in his bid for reelection by Democrat C. Gerald Lucey 14,667 votes to 14,232.

City Clerk
In 1956 he was appointed City Clerk by Mayor Hjalmar Peterson. On April 20, 1961, he was named temporary city manager after William A. Gildea was fired. On November 1, a judge ruled that Gildea was to be reinstated and Clifford was to be removed from office. However the decision was overturned on appeal and Clifford served acting manager until the position was eliminated following the inauguration of Mayor F. Milton McGrath.

References

Massachusetts city council members
Massachusetts city managers
Massachusetts Republicans
Mayors of Brockton, Massachusetts
Year of birth missing
Year of death missing